Tösh-Bulak is a village in the Sokuluk District of Chüy Region of Kyrgyzstan. Its population was 2,479 in 2021. It was known as Belogorka until 1992.

Notable people
Temir Sariyev (born 1963), a Kyrgyz politician who was Prime Minister of Kyrgyzstan from 2015 to 2016.

References

Populated places in Chüy Region